Majri Junction railway station (station code: MJRI) is a junction railway station on New Delhi–Chennai main line and Majri–Mudkhed line in Nagpur CR railway division of Central Railway Zone of Indian Railways. It serves Majri village in Chandrapur district in Maharashtra state in India. It is located at 188 m above sea level and has three platforms. 18 trains stop at this station.

References

External links

Railway stations in Chandrapur district
Nagpur CR railway division
Railway junction stations in Maharashtra